INS Deepak is a  built by Fincantieri. Deepak was launched on 13 February 2010 and commissioned on 21 January 2011.

Design and description

Capacity 
The Deepak-class tanker can carry  of cargo, including  tonnes of liquid cargo (water, ship and aircraft fuel) and  tonnes of solid cargo (victuals and ammunition). It can handle 16 cargo containers on the upper deck and was equipped with an eight-bed hospital, with laboratory and X-ray facilities. Workshop facilities on the ship can support other ships of the fleet and it is capable of supporting heavy helicopters.

Service history 
Deepak, along with  took part in India-Brazil-South Africa Maritime (IBSAMAR III) during October 2012. This ships docked at Durban for three days as part of the deployment.

See also

INS Shakti
INS Jyoti
INS Aditya

References 

Deepak-class fleet tankers
2010 ships
Ships built by Fincantieri